The first season of Top Gear began airing on History from November 21, 2010 until January 23, 2011. Consisting of ten episodes, the hosting line-up consisted of Adam Ferrera, Tanner Foust, Rutledge Wood and The Stig. The segments included Power laps and Big Star, Small Car (a renamed version of Star in a Responsibly Priced Car).

Due to the success of the first season, the programme was renewed for a second season, which aired in 2011 and 2012.

Production
After years of development, History Channel ordered an American version of Top Gear, with Adam Ferrera, Tanner Foust, Rutledge Wood and The Stig included as the hosts. A trailer for the first season aired on August 6, 2010, showing the hosts participating in a Moonshine Challenge and Foust taking the Dodge Viper for a test drive. The season premiered on November 21, 2010, and concluded on January 23, 2011. The season finale aired as a "Best of Top Gear" special, which included highlights and best moments for season 1.

Episodes

References

External links
 Season 1 at the Internet Movie Database

Top Gear seasons
2010 American television seasons
2011 American television seasons
2010 in American television
2011 in American television